Stout Hearts and Willing Hands is a 1931 American Pre-Code short comedy film directed by Bryan Foy and starring Frank Fay and Lew Cody. At the 5th Academy Awards, held in 1932, it was nominated for an Academy Award for Best Short Subject (Comedy), but was disqualified. No reason was given for the disqualification.

Cast

 Frank Fay
 Lew Cody
 Laura La Plante
 Alec B. Francis
 Mary Carr
 Owen Moore
 Tom Moore
 Matt Moore
 Georgie Harris
 Eddie Quillan
 Matthew Betz
 Maurice Black
 Benny Rubin
 Bryant Washburn
 Mack Swain
 Chester Conklin

References

External links

1931 films
1931 short films
1931 comedy films
RKO Pictures short films
American black-and-white films
Films directed by Bryan Foy
American comedy short films
1930s English-language films
1930s American films